PNZ, or pnz, may refer to

 Paralympics New Zealand, a sporting body in New Zealand
 PNZ, the IATA code for Petrolina Airport, Bahia, Brazil
 pnz, the ISO 639-3 code for the Pana language of the Central African Republic
 PNZ, the National Rail code for Penzance railway station, Cornwall, UK

See also